Danny Kwasi Amankwaa (born 30 January 1994) is a Danish professional footballer who plays as a winger for Danish 1st Division club Hobro IK. He previously played for F.C. Copenhagen, Heart of Midlothian and Denmark at youth level.

He is of Ghanaian descent.

Career

FC Copenhagen
Amankwaa was followed by clubs such as Ajax and Arsenal in 2012, but he wanted to play for FC Copenhagen. He was also on a trial at Chelsea and he revealed in 2012 that he had more trial offers, but he rejected them.

Amankwaa played his first Danish Superliga match on 29 October 2012, when he appeared as a substitute for Martin Vingaard against AC Horsens at Casa Arena Horsens in Horsens. Previously, Amankwaa played in a Danish Cup match on 26 September 2012 against FC Fredericia. His contract was extended in November 2012 until July 2015. Amankwaa scored his first goal for F.C. Copenhagen in the 3–0 Danish Cup win against SønderjyskE on 1 November 2012.

Amankwaa was promoted permanently to the first team in 2013. The contract was extended once again in May 2014 until 2017. He played 9 league matches for the first team in the 2012–13 season, and 15 matches in the second season.

In May 2015, Amankwaa suffered from an achilles tendon rupture and was out for about half a year. He went back on the pitch in October 2015, but just one month later he was back on the sideline again. He injured his meniscus and that resulted in an operation, and was out for the rest of the year. Due to all these injuries, he only played 7 league games in that season.

The injuries continued in the next season and he was operated in October 2016 for a knee injury, which kept him out for the rest of the year. His contract was extended in November 2016 until 2018.

Heart of Midlothian
On 25 January 2018, Amankwaa joined Heart of Midlothian (Hearts) on a free transfer, having been allowed to leave Copenhagen before the end of his contract. He signed an 18-month contract with the Scottish Premiership side.

SønderjyskE
With limited success in Scotland, Amankwaa went home to Denmark, signing a one-year contract with Danish Superliga-side, SønderjyskE. He left the club by the end of 2019.

Hobro IK
Amankwaa remained without club until 31 October 2020, where he signed with Danish 1st Division club Hobro IK for the rest of 2020.

Career statistics

Honours
Danish Superliga: 2012–13, 2015–16, 2016–17
Danish Cup: 2014–15, 2015–16, 2016–17

References

External links

1994 births
Living people
Danish men's footballers
Denmark youth international footballers
Denmark under-21 international footballers
Danish Superliga players
Danish 1st Division players
F.C. Copenhagen players
Heart of Midlothian F.C. players
SønderjyskE Fodbold players
Hobro IK players
Scottish Professional Football League players
Association football wingers
Danish expatriate men's footballers
Danish expatriate sportspeople in Scotland
Expatriate footballers in Scotland
Danish people of Ghanaian descent
People from Vordingborg Municipality
Sportspeople from Region Zealand